Friderica Derra de Moroda MBE (2 June 1897 – 19 June 1978) was a British dancer, choreographer and dance teacher of Greek and  Hungarian descent.

Career 

Derra de Moroda was born in Bratislava, Kingdom of Hungary, the daughter of a Greek writer and a Hungarian art historian. The family moved to Munich after the death of their father. After a ballet education, she made her debut, aged 14, on 22 February 1912 as a freelance dancer in the Vienna Secession.

From 1914, she was in England and founded her first own dance school in London. From 1918 she took lessons from Enrico Cecchetti for four years and then performed for the first time in Salzburg in 1923: A solo dance evening in the Great Hall of the Mozarteum delighted the audience. In 1936, she became a British  national.

In 1941, she took over the direction and artistic responsibility of the ballet of the National Socialist cultural organization Kraft durch Freude in Berlin, which toured regularly until 1944.

De Moroda was interned as a British citizen in a camp at Lake Constance towards the end of the war.

From 1960 onward, she devoted herself increasingly to dance research and built up an extensive library of dance-specific literature. The estate of the Derra de Moroda Dance Archives is publicly accessible at the Institute for Musicology of the University of Salzburg.

Legacy
On 15 June 1977, she was the first woman ever to be awarded an honorary doctorate from the University of Salzburg.

She was made a Member of the Order of the British Empire (OBE) in 1974.

Death
Friderica Derra de Moroda died in 1978 in Salzburg, aged 81.

References

External links 
 Portrait on National Portrait Gallery
 Portrait on NPG
 Wer war Friderica Derra de Moroda? by Stephanie Schroedter on WorldCat

20th-century British ballet dancers
British choreographers
Members of the Order of the British Empire
Ballet teachers
1897 births
1978 deaths
People from Bratislava
Naturalised citizens of the United Kingdom
British people of Greek descent
British people of Hungarian descent